Christoph Kramer (born 19 February 1991) is a German professional footballer who plays as a defensive midfielder for Bundesliga club Borussia Mönchengladbach.

After a season in their reserve team, Kramer was promoted to Bayer Leverkusen's first team in 2011. He then spent two seasons on loan at second-tier VfL Bochum, and a further two at Borussia Mönchengladbach.

Kramer made his full international debut for the Germany national team on 13 May 2014, and later that year was part of the German squad which won the 2014 FIFA World Cup.

Club career

Bayer Leverkusen
Kramer joined local club BV Graefrath in 1995 before being snapped up by Bayer Leverkusen at age eight. But Kramer was cut from the Leverkusen youth squad at age 15 in 2006 because of his relatively small height. After two years with the Fortuna Düsseldorf youth squad, Kramer returned to Leverkusen in 2008, signed his first senior contract in 2010 and was promoted to Bayer Leverkusen II for the 2010–11 season. He gained promotion to the senior squad in 2011 and was immediately loaned out to 2. Bundesliga side VfL Bochum for the 2011–12 season.

VfL Bochum (loan)
Kramer made his professional debut on 18 July 2011, coming on as a second-half substitute for Andreas Johansson in a 2–0 defeat of Bochum to Fortuna Düsseldorf. His first goal for the club came on 25 February 2012, scoring a consolation goal in a 6–2 defeat to Greuther Fürth. During the 2012–13 2. Bundesliga season, Kramer was involved in 852 tackles, the most by any player in the league, and won 50% of them. In the process, he committed 73 fouls but was only given eight yellow cards. In his two seasons in the second division with Bochum, Kramer made 61 league appearances and scored four goals. Following his spell at Bochum, he became a season-ticket holder at the RewirpowerSTADION.

Borussia Mönchengladbach (loan)
Following his two-year spell with Bochum in the second division, Kramer joined Borussia Mönchengladbach in July 2013 on a two-year loan deal. He made his Bundesliga debut on 9 August 2013, starting in midfield for Gladbach in a 3–1 loss to defending champions Bayern Munich. He scored his first goal for Gladbach in the following round of fixtures, netting the club's second goal in a 3–0 victory over Hannover 96. Kramer scored Borussia Mönchengladbach's third goal of a 3–1 victory over Mainz 05 on 3 May 2014, securing the club a place in the UEFA Europa League for the following season. In the final league match of the season, Kramer scored his third Bundesliga goal as Gladbach fell to VfL Wolfsburg 3–1, confirming that Gladbach would finish just behind Wolfsburg, in sixth place.

Kramer returned to Gladbach following his exploits in the 2014 FIFA World Cup, making his season debut on 24 August 2014, coming off the bench and scoring his side's last-minute equalizer in a 1−1 draw with VfB Stuttgart. On 9 November, away to Borussia Dortmund, he scored an own goal from inside the centre circle which gave his opponents a 1–0 victory.

On 22 December 2014, Leverkusen announced Kramer would be returning to Leverkusen from his loan spell at Gladbach in summer 2015 as planned and that his contract had been extended by two further years until 30 June 2019.

Borussia Mönchengladbach
On 8 June 2016, Kramer returned to Borussia Mönchengladbach, signing a five-year deal with the club.

International career

Shortly before the end of his first Bundesliga season, Kramer was first invited on 8 May 2014 to the Germany senior team, when he was nominated as part of a so-called "perspective squad" for the preparation match for the 2014 World Cup in the Volksparkstadion in Hamburg against Poland, as many players could not join because they still had to play for their clubs. In this friendly match on 13 May, he played the full 90 minutes of a 0–0 draw. A day later, he was subsequently nominated for the preliminary squad. He won his second cap for the national side on 1 June, coming on as a second-half substitute in a 2–2 draw with Cameroon. The following day, Kramer was included by Joachim Löw in Germany's final 23-man squad for the 2014 World Cup in Brazil.

2014 World Cup
Kramer made his first appearance of the tournament in Germany's round of 16 match against Algeria as a 109th-minute substitute for Bastian Schweinsteiger. He started the 2014 FIFA World Cup Final, due to an injury to Sami Khedira minutes before kick off. Kramer, however, was forced to leave the game in the first half after taking a hit to the head, and André Schürrle came on to replace him. It was later revealed that Kramer may have suffered a concussion from his collision with Argentine centre-back Ezequiel Garay. Referee Nicola Rizzoli admitted that 14 minutes after the collision, Kramer came to him, asking if the match was the final. Rizzoli then informed Schweinsteiger and Kramer was substituted off. The incident was later satirized by his national teammates Thomas Müller, Manuel Neuer and retired national team captain Philipp Lahm in a video which was shown during Kramer's appearance on the German sports show Das aktuelle sportstudio.

Personal life

Kramer studied at Grundschule Meigen in Solingen from 1997 to 2001. He continued secondary education at August-Dicke-Schule and finished his Abitur examination in 2010, with a grade of 3.6.

Kramer was the first Solingen citizen to have played for the Germany national team at a World Cup when he participated in the 2014 World Cup. Four years later, during 2018 FIFA World Cup, he appeared on German TV station Zweites Deutsches Fernsehen as a "TV expert" to deliver match analyses.

Career statistics

Club

International

Honours
Germany
FIFA World Cup: 2014

References

External links

Kicker profile 

1991 births
Living people
People from Solingen
Sportspeople from Düsseldorf (region)
German footballers
Germany youth international footballers
Association football midfielders
Bayer 04 Leverkusen II players
Bayer 04 Leverkusen players
VfL Bochum players
VfL Bochum II players
Borussia Mönchengladbach players
Bundesliga players
2. Bundesliga players
Germany international footballers
2014 FIFA World Cup players
FIFA World Cup-winning players
Footballers from North Rhine-Westphalia